Guerini is an Italian surname. Notable people with the surname include:

Francesco Guerini (fl. 1740–1770), Italian violinist and composer
Giuseppe Guerini (born 1970), Italian cyclist
Lorenzo Guerini (born 1966), Italian politician
Stanislas Guerini (born 1982), French politician
Vincenzo Guerini (footballer) (born 1953), Italian football player and manager
Vincenzo Guerini (athlete) (born 1950), Italian sprinter

Italian-language surnames